The Brahma Group is an asset management and investment firm headquartered in New York City, United States.

Background
The Brahma Group was founded in 2005 by Gulbir Singh Madan. The Group's structure includes an asset management firm based in New York, which manages a series of funds dedicated to investment within India across asset classes and the capital structure. The firm is currently investing in the Indian real estate sector. The size of the fund is $500 million.

The group's real estate division is based in Gurgaon, India with three projects to date in the northern belt including two in Delhi NCR. So far, the company has invested $500 million in the Indian real estate space to develop close to 400 acres of land.

In 2010, Brahma won the auction for a 12.2-acre land bank adjacent to National Highway 8, (India) to build a retail and commercial office lifestyle centre project. The project land was acquired in an auction from the Haryana State Industrial and Infrastructure Development Corporation ("HSIIDC") for Rs 620 crores. The company also bought a 150-acre property off the Golf Course Extension Road for Rs.600 crore to build a five million sq. ft township project.

In 2007, Brahma established The Valley, Panchkula, a joint venture project with DLF - India's largest realty firm, which was the group's first large-scale real estate investment. The Valley is spread over 222 acres of land at the foothills of the Shivalik Hills.

Current (2014) projects include Athena, a retail and commercial office lifestyle centre near Gurgaon and two new township developments in Delhi and at Panchkula.

Founder
Gulbir  Singh Madan is the founder and Chairman of the Brahma Group. Madan leads the firm's investment and real estate development activities. Prior to founding Brahma, Madan managed real estate investments and developments within the US real estate market, serving as the general partner of a series of real estate partnerships. Madan has over 25 years of experience in real estate investment and development

References

Financial services companies established in 2005
Investment management companies of the United States